Gordon Smith (born 6 July 1962) is a British psychic medium; known as the UK's "most accurate" medium.

Career as a medium
Gordon Smith's career as a medium began at the age of 24, when another medium told him that one day he would be 'on the platform'. This was the start of a 15-year-long study to be a medium.

As he used to work as a barber, he is often known (and used to present himself as) The Psychic Barber.

He works giving demonstrations, writing books and organising workshops, and until March 2008 wrote a psychic column for the British tabloid The Sunday People.
Smith does not charge for readings.

Smith was studied by Professor Archie Roy in a series of experiments to determine his possible psychic abilities, the results of which were published in the Journal of the Society for Psychical Research.

Television and film
He was featured in the BBC Everyman (TV series) series and in another BBC documentary, Talking to the Dead in 2003. He has also appeared on Richard & Judy, discussing mediumship.

In October 2005, Smith was revealed as the new medium on Living TV's Most Haunted, taking over from Derek Acorah. He appeared in Series 7 and three episodes of Series 8 before being replaced by David Wells.

In 2008, Smith appeared in a special "Paranormal Edition" episode of The Weakest Link, in which he made it to the final round but lost to Mia Dolan. In 2008–09, he presented his own series 'Psychic Therapy' on the Biography Channel.

Smith appeared in the film adaptation of Jackie Collins' book, Paris Connections, appearing alongside Charles Dance and Trudie Styler.

Smith has appeared on the television show This Morning, along with the skeptic and psychologist, Chris French, discussing possible psi phenomena. Both men carried out a 'reading' of two blind-folded women and then later compared their results with the women and the show's presenters.

Bibliography

 Inner Visions: A Medium's Life, Pembridge Publishing, 2000. .
 Spirit Messenger: The Remarkable Story of a Seventh Son of Seventh Son, Hay House, 2003. .
 The Unbelievable Truth, Hay House, 2004. .
 Stories from the Other Side, Hay House, 2006. .
 Through My Eyes, Hay House, 2006. .
 Life Changing Messages: Remarkable Stories From The Other Side, Hay House, 2007. .
 The Amazing Power of Animals, Hay House, 2008. . (Later published in 2018 as Animal Magic: The Extraordinary Proof of our Pets' Intuition ). 
 Developing Mediumship, Hay House, 2009. .
 Why Do Bad Things Happen?, Hay House, 2009. .
 Intuitive Studies: A Complete Course in Mediumship, Hay House, 2012. .
 Positive Vibes: Inspiring Thoughts for Change and Transformation, Hay House, 2013. .
 Best of Both Worlds, Coronet, 2014. .
 One Hundred Answers from Spirit, Coronet, 2016. .
 A Thin Place: Where Two Worlds Meet, (Children's Fiction), Cone House Publishing Limited, 2016. .
 Beyond Reasonable Doubt: The Case for Supernatural Phenomena in the Modern World, Coronet, 2018. .

References

External links

 Official Gordon Smith Website

1962 births
Living people
People from Gorbals
Scottish spiritual mediums
Scottish psychics